Gartree High School is a coeducational secondary school with academy status. Its age-range designation is 11–16. GCSEs have been taught since 2017 and its first GCSE results published in 2019. The school is situated in Oadby, a town on the south side of Leicester, England.

Notable former pupils include rock legend John Deacon of Queen.

The school's mission statement is: "Aspiring to personal excellence in a supportive community".

Age-range change

Gartree High School is an 11–16 school serving a catchment area in Oadby, Leicestershire, and surrounding villages. From 2017 students will join the school in Year 7 and leave in Year 11, following the pattern common across most of the country.

Enrichment
Enrichment was an opportunity to broaden and enhance the learning of pupils by developing their intellectual, personal and social skills through a variety of challenging and engaging contexts.

During the academic year, pupils were given the opportunity to choose 4 days of different activities outside the normal school curriculum, which they then study for the whole week in mixed-ability and mixed-aged groups.

There are many different activities. Here is a small selection:
•Bright Lights, Big City: a study of the capital city including two visits.
•Helping Hands: a week doing a variety of voluntary work to help the community around Gartree.
•Peak District: a visit to the largest national park in England, camping and hiking through the rolling hills of the White Peaks.
•Handmade at Gartree:  making a variety of products from a variety of materials.
•The Rome Experience: plan and journey to one of the most culturally rich cities in Europe.
•My Pony: learning about all things equine, as well as spending two days down at the stables.
•Animals & Nature Around us: travel to Whipsnade Zoo and learn about the environment and its protection.

Enrichment is no longer a part of school life at gartree.

Trips and opportunities
There is a wide range of trips and extra-curricular opportunities for pupils to partake in during their time at Gartree High School. There are a number of foreign residential trips. These include the Year 7 residential trip to France, the Year 9 Geography trip to Iceland.

In KS4 there are several other trips. These include camping in the Peak District, a London to Paris cycle trip and a Skiing trip.

Alongside these foreign residentials there are many trips in the Humanities, Design Technology and Science departments, including the Science Museum, the Big Bang show, The V&A and Design Museum, The Clothes Show, as well as the Eden Project Stretch and Challenge trip.

Hearing-impaired unit
Gartree High School used to host Leicestershire's Schools Hearing Impaired Unit.
The Hearing Impaired Unit has since moved to a purpose built facility which is situated on the neighboring Beauchamp College site.

Origins and history
In 1707-15 there was apparently no school in Oadby, according to Bishop Wake's visitation questionnaire.
An 1818 parliamentary enquiry recorded that the only means of education for poorer families in Oadby was a Sunday School connected to St Peter's Church, attended by 117 children. In 1838 the parish received funds to establish an infants' school and a daily school. In 1872 a school board was set up to provide additional school places, and a school in the Baptist church's schoolroom was opened in 1872. It became a council school after school boards were abolished by the 1902 Education Act.

A new council school for older children was opened in 1929. An inspection of the council school in 1933 records that there were 5 junior and five senior classes. Following the 1944 Education Act the council school became a secondary school and was officially named Gartree Modern School in 1948.

A punishment book from the County School which commenced in April 1945 was continued at Gartree Modern, survived the move to the new site in 1960 and was used until 1983 (first entry: "Persistent Disobedience," 12.4.45; final entry: "Disruptive behaviour in class," 9.2.83).

The Leicestershire Plan of the late 1950s saw a new vision for secondary education in Leicestershire. According to Stewart Mason (Director of Education for Leicestershire until 1971) "the 11-plus examination and the resultant segregation of children into grammar and secondary modern schools is an offence against reason and public conscience." The plan he has devised, and which was put into effect across the County, meant the abolition of 11-plus segregation; and at the age of fourteen there could be transfer to the Grammar School without examination for all children whose parents choose it for them and promised to keep them there beyond sixteen.

In 1968, eleven years after the introduction of the Leicestershire Plan, Gartree became a high school and Manor High School, Oadby was created.

In 1973 the age of transfer to secondary school in Oadby was lowered to 10 and Brookside Primary opened on adjoining land, allowing children to remain in the same locality from 4–18.

Gartree High School opened on its current site in October 1960. The opening was conducted by Professor C A Coulson, professor of Mathematics from Oxford University.
The school provided "a complete range of secondary courses during the compulsory stage for children from Oadby, Burton Overy, Great Glen, Houghton-on-the-Hill, Hungerton, Keyham, Newton Harcourt, Scraptoft, Stoughton, Great and Little Stretton and Thurnby." After three years pupils had the option to transfer to Guthlaxton Grammar School in Wigston.
The building was originally planned to hold 450 pupils but was expanded to accommodate 600 children.

House System

A house system was introduced in September 2014. 
Each student is placed into one of the following houses, named after seas and oceans:
Arctic (Green)
Atlantic (Yellow)
Pacific (Red) 
Caspian (Blue) .

This is not the first house system employed in the school. Under an earlier scheme, the school was also divided into four houses, all named after famous people connected with the Leicester area:Wolsey (Red), after Cardinal Wolsey, Lord Chancellor of England who died in Leicester Abbey, 1530.Wycliffe (Green), after John Wycliffe, theologian and Bible-translator, who was rector of Lutterworth in Leicestershire.de Montfort (Blue), after Simon de Montfort, 6th Earl of Leicester and de facto ruler of England during the Second Barons' War.Carey''' (Yellow), after William Carey, missionary and social reformer, who was pastor of Harvey Lane Baptist Church, Leicester between 1782 and 1793. 
Pupils were required to wear sports gear of their house colour, as well as coloured pin badges on their uniforms. Good work was rewarded with "merit" certificates which could be exchanged for "house points". (House points could also be forfeited for bad behaviour.) This system was abolished after the summer of 1977, though the house colours persisted on the sports fields until around 1979.

New school rebuild

The 1960s two-storey building was replaced in 2007. The new building is on the same campus. The current building was being built behind the previous building. The 1960s construction was at the front of the current campus, which explains the humps on the front field, which were formed during the building work. As of 2019 there are no remains of the 1960s building left – all other counterparts have since been demolished. The only other building is on Beauchamp College with a small building left.
The initial cost of the new building was estimated at £12 million. It opened to students in early July 2007.

Head Teachers
E S C Coggins

Wallace (Wally) Eyre

John Armitage

Diane Edwards

Rosemary Goldberg

Sonia Singleton

References

Secondary schools in Leicestershire
Academies in Leicestershire
People educated at Gartree High School